Gladiator: Fight for Freedom is the first book in the Gladiator Series, by Simon Scarrow and is his first book for young adults.
Set in Rome in 61 BC, it tells the story of Marcus Cornelius Primus who is enslaved and becomes a gladiator.

Plot summary
Marcus Cornelius Primus is a young gladiator that was a farm boy until he was kidnapped away from his mother and father, who is a retired centurion. He is sold as a slave to a gladiator school and is trying to find help and justice to stop the people that took him.

Style
The Gladiator series is intended for young teens and older. The story is quite clear, fast and without excessive details. The frequent action scenes are described very precisely and graphically.

References

External links

2011 British novels
2011 children's books
Children's historical novels
British young adult novels
Gladiator (novel series)
Novels set in the 1st century BC
Gladiatorial combat in fiction
Penguin Press books